Igua is an extinct genus of iguanian lizards belonging to a group called Gobiguania that was endemic to the Gobi Desert during the Late Cretaceous. The type species Igua minuta was named in 1991 on the basis of a skull from the Barun Goyot Formation in Mongolia. The snout-vent length of the individual (the total body length minus the tail) is estimated to have been . Igua differs from related gobiguanians like Polrussia in having a more rounded skull. It is similar in appearance to the living genera Liolaemus and Tropidurus. The teeth are tricuspid and pleurodont, meaning they are attached to inner surfaces of the jaws.

Below is a cladogram from Daza et al. (2012) showing the phylogenetic relationships of Igua:

References

Cretaceous lizards
Late Cretaceous lepidosaurs of Asia
Fossil taxa described in 1991
Prehistoric lizard genera